The Fitzroy Developmental Road is a designated road in the Central Highlands Region of Queensland consisting of three separate sections. The general direction is from south to north.

Route description

Southern section

Middle section
It passes through the Dawson Range State Forest between Woorabinda and Duaringa.

Northern section
It crosses the Mackenzie River and passes the mining town of Middlemount.

Length details

Road details
All sections are state-controlled roads. The southern and middle sections (numbers 85A and 85B) are district roads rated as local roads of regional significance (LRRS). The northern section (number 85C) is a regional road.

Upgrades

Progressive sealing
A project to progressively seal sections of the road north of Bauhinia, at a cost of $6 million, was expected to complete by early 2022.

A project to progressively seal sections of the road north of Taroom, at a cost of $8 million, was expected to complete in mid-2022.

Major intersections

See also

 Highways in Australia
 List of highways in Queensland

References

Highways in Queensland
Buildings and structures in Central Queensland